Danielle "Dan" Turner (born 10 September 1991) is an English professional footballer who plays as a defender for Aston Villa

Club career
Turner began her football training at the Everton Ladies Centre of Excellence.

In 2012, Turner secured a loan move with Icelandic side, Stjarnan of the Úrvalsdeild kvenna. Turner featured for a successful stint with the Icelandic club who won the Women's Cup and the Supercup during the 2012 season. In 2013, Turner would help Stjarnan win the league, the Icelandic League Cup Women A, and finish as runners-up in the Supercup.

By the 2013 season, Turner would return to Everton L.F.C. and begin to regularly feature for the Blues. Her efforts earned her a two-year deal with Everton in December 2014.

Deployed as a left wing-back, Turner has been a regular for the Blues since signing her deal, scoring a career high seven goals during the 2015 season.

During the fourth round of 2016–17 FA Cup, Turner filled in for the injured Kirstie Levell as goalkeeper and was able to help the Blues past a shootout against Durham. The victory and performance earned Turner Player of the Round honours.

Turner was named team captain ahead of Everton's return to WSL 1 for 2017–18 season, succeeding the departing Michelle Hinnigan. She announced her departure from Everton on 24 June 2022 after 15 years at the club.

International career
Turner has represented England at the U-19 and U-23 levels.

Honours
Stjarnan
 Women's Cup Winners (1): 2012
 Icelandic Supercup Winners (1): 2012
 Icelandic Supercup runners-up (1): 2013
 Úrvalsdeild kvenna Winners (1): 2013
 Icelandic League Cup Women A Winners (1): 2013

Everton
 FA Women's Cup runners-up (1): 2013–14
 FA WSL 2 Winners (1): 2017

Individual
2016–17 SSE Women's FA Cup Player of Round Four

References

External links

Everton Profile

Living people
English women's footballers
Everton F.C. (women) players
FA Women's National League players
1991 births
Women's association football defenders
Stjarnan women's football players

Aston Villa W.F.C. players